Ramgarh crater, also  known as Ramgarh structure, Ramgarh Dome and Ramgarh astrobleme, is a meteor impact crater of  diameter in Kota plateau of Vindhya range located adjacent to Ramgarh village in Mangrol tehsil of Baran district in Rajasthan state of India. When formally accepted as the third crater in India, its diameter size would be between the two already confirmed craters in India - Dhala in Madhya Pradesh with 14 km diameter and Lonar in Buldhana district of Maharashtra with 1.8 km diameter. 

It is designated as a National Geological Monument. The Bhand Deva Temple, a 10th-century Shiva temple in the style of the Khajuraho Group of Monuments, is located near the centre of the crater. Kuno National Park, 50-60 km away, is accessible by multiple entry points via minor roads or NH6. Crater lies 110 km from Kota, 250 from Jaipur and 500 km from Delhi. It is 200 km west of Lonar crater in Madhya Pradesh.

Scientific studies
The crater is yet to be fully investigated in a systematic way. In 1869, crater was first visited by geologist Frederick Richard Mallet of Geological Survey of India (GSI). Rai Bahadur Kishan Singh Rawat (1850-1921), a colonial era Indian explorer and cartographer, was first to map it on a small scale (1 : 63,360). Other studies include by those of Arthur Lennox Coulson (1927–28), Sharma and Singh and Jaganathan and Rao (1969–70), Crawford (1972), Rakshit (1973), Ramaswamy (1981), Vimal Kumar Reddy(1984) etc. A rootless mass of sheared sandstone found near Bandewara temple in the crater indicates a fall back material. Crawford, after discovering shatter coned colluvium in the middle of the crater, was first to suggest that this was an impact crater. Auden suggested that the crater in upper Vindhya Range might be kimberlite intrusion similar to Majhgawan kimberlite intrusion. In 1960, Geological Society of London recognised it as an impact crater. In addition, the Ramgarh crater is already among the confirmed/proven list of impact craters based on three-step confidence level criteria of Anna Mikheeva of Russian Academy of Sciences (1 for probable, 2 for potential, 3 for questionable), applied to the impact sites that have appeared several times in the literature and/or have been endorsed by the Impact Field Studies Group (IFSG) and/or Expert Database on Earth Impact Structures (EDEIS).

The Earth Impact Database (EID), at the University of New Brunswick in Canada, is used as the most authoritative for confirming the impact craters. The confirmation of Ramgarh being impact crater from EID is pending. In January 2018 Professor Vinod Agrawal and Geologists Pushpendra Singh Ranawat and Mr. Jitendra kumar sharma (convenor INTACH Baran chapter), members of team composed of GSI, INTACH and Mohanlal Sukhadia University, which visited the crater to collect samples for the scientific study of the genesis of the crater, said the several types of evidence at crater meets the established criteria for the meteorite impact and that is a very rare site in India of multi-faceted significance including geological heritage. Team stated that the ample research on the site has been conducted to gather geochemical and other evidence published in peer reviewed journals, hence once the evidence is accepted by the national and global approving entities in India and Canada respectively the crater will be likely recognised as 191st impact crater in the world and 3rd in India by 2020 by the Earth Impact Database.

Geology

Topography
Located on a 240m MSL high plateau, the  diameter Ramgarh ring crater rise further 150 to 200 m above the surrounding plateau. Located in Vindhya Range it is part of Bhander Group of Vindhyan Supergroup it has a raised rim and a circular depression in its centre forming a plain with average elevation of 260 m above sea level.

Hydrology
Ramgarh rivulet flows from the south-west chasm of the crater and it becomes a tributary of Parvati river 4 km in the west. There are several other gullies (deeper channel and ditches cut into rocks and soil by the erosive action of fast flowing forceful water) and rills (shallow channel cut into soil by the erosive action of flowing water) formed with radial (flowing out of crater) and centripetal (flowing in to crater) drainage. Radial streams flow into the Parbati River, a tributary of Chambal River,

Mineralogy
Glass resembling rock samples were collected and investigated. These spherules contain very high percentage of iron, along with very high ratios of nickel and cobalt. This high ratios suggests a meteorite strike or extraterrestrial rocks.

See also

 Impact craters in India
 Dhala crater in Shivpuri district of Madhya Pradesh
 Lonar crater at Lonar in Buldhana district of Maharashtra
 Luna crater at Kutch district of Gujarat
 Shiva crater, an undersea super crater west of India

 Other related topics
 List of impact craters on Earth
 List of possible impact structures on Earth
 List of lakes in India
 List of national parks of India
 Ramsar Convention
 Soda lake

References

Possible impact craters on Earth
Impact craters of India
Landforms of Rajasthan
Geology of Rajasthan
National Geological Monuments in India